On 27 June 2022, a building partially collapsed in Kurla, Mumbai, Maharashtra, India. The four-storey, 50-year-old building, which had been in poor condition for years, collapsed at around 11:30pm. At least 19 people were killed and many others injured.

Background 
The housing structure was constructed in 1975 on collector land and originally housed over 40 people. It was first served a notice for repairs in 2013, and then in 2016 the Brihanmumbai Municipal Corporation (BMC) disconnected the water and electricity to the structure and asked them to vacate. This request was refused by residents who hired a structural auditor to submit a report that the damage was repairable, and after the report it was removed from the 'dilapidated building' list and added to the 'under repairs' list.

Collapse 
On the night of 27 June, the four story building, which was one of the four wings of the Naik Nager cooperative housing systems collapsed. All four parts of the building had been deemed dilapidated by the BMC. A resident acknowledged that all residents knew the building was dilapidated and had been previously asked by the chairmen of the BMC to vacate the premises by 30 June, causing many to be in the process of looking for new housing.

Legal 
The owners of the building Rajni Rathod, Kishor Chavan, Balkrishna Rathod and others were arrested under charges of culpable homicide not amounting to murder and attempt to commit culpable homicide shortly after the collapse of the building. A contractor, named as Dilip Vishwas who housed labourers in the building was also arrested.

See also
 2013 Mumbai building collapse

References

2022 disasters in India
2022 building collapse
Building collapses in 2022
Building collapses in India
2022 building collapse
2022 building collapse
June 2022 events in India